Procaimanoidea ("Before Caiman-forms") is an extinct genus of alligatorid from the Eocene of North America.  It was named posthumously in 1946 by Charles W. Gilmore; the type species is P. utahensis, from the Uintan (middle Eocene) of Utah.  It is based on USNM 15996, a nearly complete skull and partial left hind leg. A second species, P. kayi, was named in 1941 by C.C. Mook as a species of Hassiacosuchus, for remains from the Bridgerian (early Eocene) of Wyoming. It was reassigned to Procaimanoidea in 1967 by Wassersug and Hecht.

Description 
Procaimanoidea was a small alligatorid, and slightly heterodont, the last four teeth on each side of the jaws having blunt tips.

Phylogeny 
Recent studies have consistently resolved Procaimanoidea as a member of Alligatorinae, although its relative placement is disputed, as shown by the cladograms below.

Cladogram from 2018 Bona et al. study:

Cladogram from 2019 Massonne et al. study:

Cladogram from 2020 Cossette & Brochu study:

References

External links
Procaimanoidea in the Paleobiology Database

Alligatoridae
Eocene crocodylomorphs
Eocene reptiles of North America
Prehistoric pseudosuchian genera
Taxa named by Charles W. Gilmore